The Descobrimento National Park is a national park in the state of Bahia, Brazil.

Location

The Descobrimento National Park is in the municipality of Prado, Bahia.
It contains the Discovery Coast World Natural Heritage Site, a Biosphere Reserve.

Environment

The Descobrimento National Park is in the Atlantic Forest biome.
It holds an important fragment of Atlantic Forest of the northeast plateau of Brazil, and the most important wildlife refuge of the south of Bahia.
Protected species in the park include the cougar (Puma concolor), the characid fish Mimagoniates sylvicola and the bird species ringed woodpecker (Celeus torquatus), black-headed berryeater (Carpornis melanocephala), red-billed curassow (Crax blumenbachii), banded cotinga (Cotinga maculata), band-tailed antwren (Myrmotherula urosticta), ochre-marked parakeet (Pyrrhura cruentata) and striated softtail (Thripophaga macroura).

Administration

It became part of the Central Atlantic Forest Ecological Corridor, created in 2002.
It is administered by the Chico Mendes Institute for Biodiversity Conservation (ICMBio).
The consultative council was established on 1 February 2008, and the management plan was approved on 26 December 2014.
The park is classed as IUCN protected area category II (national park).
The objective is to preserve a natural ecosystem of great ecological relevance and scenic beauty, and to support scientific research, environmental education and interpretation, outdoors recreation and ecotourism.

Notes

Sources

1999 establishments in Brazil
National parks of Brazil
Protected areas of Bahia
Protected areas of the Atlantic Forest